Camilla "Milly" Vitale (16 July 1933 – 2 November 2006) was an Italian actress. She was the daughter of Riccardo Vitale (Rome Opera House Director, deceased 1979)  and choreographer Natasha Shidlowski Vitale (deceased 1994).

She appeared in numerous post-war Italian films. She appeared in a few Hollywood movies but never achieved star status like her contemporaries Sophia Loren and Gina Lollobrigida. In her most notable U.S. role, she appeared with Bob Hope as "Madeleine Morundo Foy" in The Seven Little Foys (1956). She was featured in The Juggler co-starring with Kirk Douglas (1953) and in the epic film War and Peace (1956).

Personal life
She married Vincent Hillyer, a United States citizen, in 1960; the marriage produced two sons, Edoardo and Vincent Jr. The couple divorced about 1970. Vitale retired from acting in the early 1970s, after a career of more than 47 films. She died in Rome in 2006.

Selected filmography

References

External links
 

1933 births
2006 deaths
Actresses from Rome
Italian film actresses
Italian people of Russian descent
20th-century Italian actresses